Rai language may refer to:

 Rai languages or Kiranti languages, a family of Sino-Tibetan languages spoken in Nepal, India and Bhutan by Rai people.
Bantawa language, a Kiranti language spoken in Nepal, Darjeeling, Sikkim, Kalimpong and Bhutan
 Chamling language, a Kiranti language spoken in parts of Nepal and Darjeeling, Sikkim, Kalimpong and Southern Bhutan
  Thulung language, a Kiranti language spoken in parts of Nepal and Sikkim
  Bayung Language, a Kiranti language spoken in the eastern part of Nepal, particularly Okhaldhunga and Solukhumbu districts. Thare are a few Bayung communities in Khotang and Terhathum.
  Khaling Language - a Kiranti Language spoken in the northern part of Solukhumbu district
  Kulung Language - a Kiranti Language spoken in the north-west part of Solukhumbu district

See also
 Rai Coast languages, a family of languages in the Madang stock of New Guinea, not related to Rai languages or Dewas Rai
 Rai people, an indigenous ethnolinguistic group of Nepal and some north eastern regions of India
 Sakela, festival of Kirat Rai people